Schwarzes Eis (Black Ice) is the sixth studio album from German band Blutengel. It was released as a single CD and 2x CD limited edition, and 3x CD box set. "Dancing in the Light'' was released as a single preceding the album, with an accompanying music video.

Track listing

References

External links

2009 albums
Blutengel albums